Japan Nite is an annual music event in North America which began in 1996, featuring Japanese rock, pop, and alternative music artists. Originally centered around South by Southwest in Austin, Texas, the event expanded in later years to include multi-city tours of the United States, and has often been the first US performance for the participating artists.

History 
Japan Nite was conceived by Hiroshi Asada, former manager of Pizzicato Five, and Audrey Kimura, the founder of the independent Japanese label Benten.

Asada organized a showcase called Psycho Night (a play on the Japanese word saiko, for "awesome") at the 1992 New Music Seminar in New York City featuring only Japanese acts, including Pizzicato Five. Asada was approached by representatives from SXSW who invited him to create a similar showcase in Austin, since there was not a strong presence of Asian music at the festival at the time.

Kimura brought her band Lolita No. 18 to perform at the first Japan Nite in 1996, the first Japanese band to ever play SXSW.

In 2008, the all-girl rock band Scandal toured the U.S. as part of the Japan Nite tour, the band's first tour outside of Japan.

In 2011, Japan Nite's performances at SXSW benefitted the Japanese Red Cross's recovery efforts for the Great East Japan Earthquake. In 2013, Japan Nite's tour extended to Canada for the first time with a performance at Canadian Music Week.

In 2016, X Japan leader Yoshiki made a surprise guest appearance at Japan Nite's SXSW performance in Austin on the same night as the festival's premiere of the documentary film We Are X.

In 2020, the Japan Nite tour was cancelled due to COVID-19 restrictions.

Reception 
Japan Nite's reputation among music journalists has been anchored in its eclectic showcase of unusual artists. The Austin Chronicle said "Japan Nite usually means getting your mind blown" and LA Weekly characterized the tour as "bringing an eclectic mix of alternative-minded Japanese bands".

Participating artists 
"It used to be that most of the artists at Japan Nite were major label bands," Asada said. "The music business people thought that one show at SXSW would be enough to make a deal out of, but it isn’t so easy." Lack of participation from major labels became a major factor in the tour's programming, and Japan Nite's lineup shifted away from the mainstream in later years, featuring primarily alternative music acts. "I go for the weird bands,” Asada said. "If we could deal with major labels, we could set that up, but they just focus on the Japanese market now."

Japan Nite Artist Lineup

External links 
Japan Nite Facebook

References 

Music festivals in the United States